"Peace Sells" is a song by American thrash metal band Megadeth from their 1986 album Peace Sells... but Who's Buying?, written by Dave Mustaine. The song was released as the band's second ever single in November 1986. "Peace Sells" was the groups breakthrough hit, and is regarded as one of the best songs in the history of heavy metal. Since 1985, the song has since been a constant at Megadeth concerts. According to David Ellefson, it became quickly apparent when playing the song live prior to recording the album that "Peace Sells" would be a hit. In 2006, VH1 ranked "Peace Sells" at number 11 on their list of the "40 Greatest Metal Songs" of all time. 

The song is also known for the distinctive bass intro played by Ellefson. The video for the track became an MTV mainstay and the bassline was used as introduction to MTV News. However, Mustaine proclaimed that they received no royalties because the song was excluded shortly before MTV would have to pay them for its use.

Background

Lyrics 

"Peace Sells" reflects band frontman Dave Mustaine's political and social beliefs. The title of the song was taken from a magazine Mustaine saw, which said "Peace sells, but nobody's buying it".  Band drummer Gar Samuelson encouraged Mustaine to write more political lyrics in his songs, which in turn helped the song be a success. The lyrics for the song were written on the wall of the bands rehearsal space, due to Mustaine not having a pen or paper to write with. The song dispels stereotypes of metal fans that were pushed by the media throughout the '80s.

Music 

The bass intro for "Peace Sells" was written by Mustaine. Ellefson had a BC Rich Eagle bass that he had removed the frets from. When Mustaine saw it, he grabbed the bass and almost immediately wrote the intro. Later that day, the two met up with Samuelson and guitarist Chris Poland, where the song would be fully fleshed out. The original version spanned over eight minutes, and was written in only a few hours. Samuelson suggested that the song be shortened, saying "This song's too good to draw it out like that. We've gotta make this song short and sweet."

The second half of the song bumps up the tempo and speeds through to the end. It has more guitar solos from Poland, and features Ellefson adding a high harmony to Mustaines main vocal refrain.

Music video 
A music video was produced for the song, which was the band's first ever (Wake Up Dead, the lead single, only got a video after its UK release). The video was directed by artist Robert Longo and edited by artist Gretchen Bender. The video includes a dramatic pause in the middle of the song.  The interstitial features a teenage boy, wearing a Slayer T-shirt, watching a montage of live Megadeth performances and war footage on his living room television set. The boy's father, states "What is this garbage you're watching? I want to watch the news!," and changes the television channel to a news station using the remote control. His son, replying with "This is the news!," changes it back to the Megadeth performance using the TV set's channel knob. This part of the video was parodied by comedian Brian Posehn in his Metal by Numbers video. The beginning of the video also showed the explosion of the original low-cost skull used on the cover of the previous album, Killing is My Business... and Business is Good!.

The video is recognized as one of the main reasons the band broke into the mainstream.

Due to the flashing images near the end, the video was banned in the UK.

Live performance 
On July 14, 1999, Samuelson died of liver failure at age 41 in Orange City, Florida. Eleven days later, during Megadeth's performance at Woodstock 1999, Mustaine dedicated "Peace Sells" to Samuelson's memory.

Legacy

Accolades

Certifications

Personnel 
Production and performance credits are adapted from the album liner notes. 

Megadeth
Dave Mustaine – guitars, lead vocals
David Ellefson – bass, backing vocals
Chris Poland – guitars
Gar Samuelson – drums

Production
Dave Mustaine – production
Randy Burns – production, engineering
Casey McMackin – engineering
Paul Lani – mixing
Stan Katayama – mixing

2004 remix and remaster
Dave Mustaine – production, mixing
Ralph Patlan – engineering, mixing
Lance Dean – engineering, editing
Scott "Sarge" Harrison – editing
Tom Baker – mastering

See also 
 List of anti-war songs

References

External links
   Official music video: https://www.youtube.com/watch?v=rdEupVsL07E

1986 singles
1986 songs
Capitol Records singles
Megadeth songs
Protest songs
Songs written by Dave Mustaine